Medon may refer to:
 Medon (mythology), any of several persons with the name in Greek mythology
 Medon (beetle), a genus in the family Staphylinidae
 Médon, a town in Ivory Coast
 Medon, Tennessee, a city in Madison County
 Medon, a synonym for Leucandra, a genus of calcareous sponge
 4836 Medon, an asteroid
 Caroline Medon (1802–1882), German opera singer
 Tion Medon, a character in Star Wars: Revenge of the Sith

See also
 Meudon, a town in France